Mike Gonzalez (born 1978) is an American baseball pitcher.

Mike Gonzalez or González may also refer to:
 Mike González (catcher) (1890–1977), Cuban baseball catcher
 Mike Gonzalez (historian) (born 1943), British historian and literary critic

See also
Miguel González (disambiguation)
Miguel Ángel González (disambiguation)
Michael Gonzales (disambiguation)